Garrett Snuff Mills Historic District is a national historic district located at Yorklyn, New Castle County, Delaware.  The district encompasses 31 contributing buildings, including the 14 buildings previously listed in the Garrett Snuff Mill.  The 17 additional buildings are 19th century domestic buildings associated with the mills.  They include the mill owner's and supervisor's houses, a late Victorian frame house, and four rows of workers' housing.

It was listed on the National Register of Historic Places in 1980.

References

External links

Historic American Engineering Record in Delaware
Houses on the National Register of Historic Places in Delaware
Historic districts on the National Register of Historic Places in Delaware
Houses in New Castle County, Delaware
Historic districts in New Castle County, Delaware
National Register of Historic Places in New Castle County, Delaware
Tobacco buildings in the United States